Emesopsis streiti is a species of Emesinae described from  Malaysia.

Emesopsis streiti was found of decaying bamboo culms of Gigantochloa scortechinii. The species preyed upon a wide variety of insect and arthropod groups.  E. streiti is apparently preyed upon by theridiid spiders.

Etymology 
This species is named in honour of the Swiss ecologist Prof. Bruno Streit.

References

Hemiptera of Asia
Reduviidae
Insects described in 1995